Nam Fung is one of the 35 constituencies in the Eastern District, Hong Kong.

The constituency returns one district councillor to the Eastern District Council, with an election every four years. It was created in the 1994 election and current held by Cheung Kwok-cheong, member of the Democratic Party.

Nam Fung constituency is loosely based on Nam Fung Sun Chuen and Mount Parker Lodge in Sai Wan Ho with estimated population of 13,692.

Councillors represented

Election results

2010s

2000s

1990s

Notes

References

Sai Wan Ho
Constituencies of Hong Kong
Constituencies of Eastern District Council
1994 establishments in Hong Kong
Constituencies established in 1994